Gondola Ridge is a high rocky ridge just south of Mackay Glacier, extending northeast from Mount Suess for about  in Victoria Land, Antarctica. It was charted by the Western Geological Party of the British Antarctic Expedition, 1910–13, who so named it because Mount Suess, to which the ridge is joined, resembles a gondola in shape.

References

Ridges of Victoria Land
Scott Coast